Grafenberg is an urban quarter of Düsseldorf, part of Borough 7. It borders to Gerresheim, Ludenberg, Flingern and Düsseltal.

Grafenberg is one of the smallest quarters in Düsseldorf. It is a green area and an expensive place to live (but not as expensive as e.g. Oberkassel).

References

Grafenbergg